Brunswick Peninsula is a large peninsula in Magallanes y la Antártica Region, Patagonia, Chile, at .

Geography
It widens to almost  in the south. The Strait of Magellan defines the eastern and southern limits while the Otway Sound (Seno Otway) delimits its western shores. It measures  in length from the base to Cape Froward, the southernmost point of the American mainland.

Origin of name
Brunswick is a city, and former duchy in Germany. It was the seat of the Principality of Brunswick-Wolfenbüttel. In 1815 Frederick William, Duke of Brunswick-Wolfenbüttel, nephew of Britain's George III, joined the Duke of Wellington in the Quatre Bras Battle against Napoleon Bonaparte and was killed in battle.  In his honor, English explorers gave the name Brunswick to the newly charted land of South America.

Settlement 
The only city in the Peninsula is Punta Arenas, the regional capital. It is located on the northeast coast and near the Straits of Magellan. The area is thinly populated with all settlements clustered on the east coast but the entire peninsula is treated as a single administrative unit, the commune (municipality) of Punta Arenas.

The commune also includes all islands west of the Isla Grande de Tierra del Fuego and north of Cockburn and Magdalena channels. These are mostly uninhabited and among them are: Isla Capitán Aracena, Clarence Island (south),  Desolación Island, and Dawson Island (southeast). To the northwest, the peninsula borders the commune of Laguna Blanca, and in the northeast, San Gregorio.

References

 
Peninsulas of Chile
Landforms of Magallanes Region